10th Panzer Division may refer to:

 10th Panzer Division (Wehrmacht)
 10th Panzer Division (Bundeswehr)
 10th SS Panzer Division Frundsberg